Big Deal Music is an American music publisher, founded in 2012 by former Chrysalis Music employees Kenny MacPherson, Jamie Cerreta and Dave Ayers. Headed by MacPherson, the trio is joined by principles Michael MacDonald, Pete Robinson and Casey Robison. 

In September 2020, Big Deal was acquired by Hipgnosis Songs Fund. The company, including its Words and Music publisher, was immediately renamed Hipgnosis Songs Group. MacPherson was named CEO of Hipgnosis Songs Group, with co-presidents Cerreta and Robison, executive vice president Ayers, and senior vice president Robinson signing new five year contracts with the publisher.

The publisher's catalogue has earned 5 Grammy Awards, 126 NMPA, BMI and ASCAP awards, and 27 RIAA certifications.

The roster currently includes: My Morning Jacket, Teddy Geiger, Sleater-Kinney,
Ray LaMontagne, St. Vincent, The Afghan Whigs, Dan Wilson, Martie Maguire & Emily Robison, Jim James, Sharon Van Etten, The Black Angels, Ethan Johns, Preservation Hall Jazz Band, Missy Higgins, FIDLAR, Wye Oak, Birds of Tokyo, Underworld and Jonathan Wilson, and songwriters Brett Beavers, Tim James, Brad Tursi, John Ryan, Dave Sitek, Matt Morris and Matt Mahaffey.  The company is administered by BMG and Peermusic.

References

External links

Music publishing companies of the United States
2012 establishments in the United States